Robert Murray "Bob" Pringle (born April 25, 1946 in Regina, Saskatchewan) is a former Canadian politician, who last served as a city councillor for Ward 7 on Saskatoon City Council in Saskatoon, Saskatchewan. He previously served as a New Democratic Party member of the Legislative Assembly of Saskatchewan, representing the electoral district of Saskatoon Eastview from 1988 to 1998. While in the legislature, he served as Minister of Social Services and Minister Responsible for Senior's Issues in the government of Roy Romanow.

Pringle has bachelor's and master's degrees in social work from the University of Manitoba. He previously served as the CEO of the Saskatoon Food Bank, and as executive directors of Cosmo Industries, the Saskatoon Housing Coalition, and Habitat for Humanity Saskatoon. He began a five-year term as Saskatchewan's children's advocate starting on January 1, 2011, and as such resigned his seat on city council on December 31, 2010.

References

External links
 Children's Advocate – biography of Bob Pringle

1946 births
Living people
Politicians from Regina, Saskatchewan
Saskatoon city councillors
Children's Ombudsmen
Ombudsmen in Canada
Saskatchewan New Democratic Party MLAs
University of Manitoba alumni
20th-century Canadian politicians
21st-century Canadian politicians